Competine Creek is a  tributary of the Des Moines River, joining it at Lake Red Rock. It rises to the southwest of Knoxville in Marion County, Iowa.

See also
List of rivers of Iowa

References

Rivers of Iowa
Tributaries of the Des Moines River
Bodies of water of Marion County, Iowa